Group CN is a category of motorsport, introduced by the FIA in the early nineties for sports car racing. Group CN cars are mainly seen in hillclimbing championships or sports racing series. Group CM is a non-FIA class which is closely related to Group CN.

Major racing series

Group CN rules are applied to a variety of championships. Many championships alter the rules in their own way like the Radical European Masters and V de V championships.

Radical European Masters

The Radical European Masters is a spec racing series in Europe. It features the Radical SR8, Radical RXC Spyder and Radical SR3, each in their own class.

V de V

The French-based V de V organisation features two FFSA Group CN based classes. The endurance championship is open for any chassis and engine within the regulations. The V de V organisation also features the Funyo Challenge open to Peugeot powered Funyo 4 or Funyo 5.

National championships
A Group CN racing class exists in many countries, many of which utilize radicals. Examples are the Radical UK Cup which features the Radical SR3 and the Open España Prototipos.

GT & Prototype Challenge
Ran as part of the Benelux-based Supercar Challenge, the GT & Prototype Challenge allows Group CN classification cars to compete; current competitors include the Radical SR3 and Norma M20 FC.

FIA Group CN technical regulations

See also

 List of Group CN sports cars

References

Sports car racing
Fédération Internationale de l'Automobile
Racing car classes